The 133rd Massachusetts General Court, consisting of the Massachusetts Senate and the Massachusetts House of Representatives, met in 1912 during the governorship of Eugene Foss. Levi H. Greenwood served as president of the Senate and Grafton D. Cushing served as speaker of the House.

Notable legislation included the creation of a minimum wage commission.

Senators

Representatives

See also
 1912 Massachusetts gubernatorial election
 62nd United States Congress
 List of Massachusetts General Courts

References

Further reading

External links
 
 

Political history of Massachusetts
Massachusetts legislative sessions
massachusetts
1912 in Massachusetts